In Roman Egypt,  (plural ) was an enclosed (and often fortified) "watering station" along trade routes in dry regions. A hydreuma was a manned and fortified watering hole or way station along a caravan route, providing a man-made oasis.

Etymology 

The term  only refers to wells, not to any other source of water. An example of the other usages of the term "hydreuma" are the water basins of Roman era-Kharga Oasis and outlying parts of villages with wells there.

Construction, use and history 

 are fortified water supply posts in the Eastern Sahara. According to Strabo they had wells or cisterns: 
 A  had either one large cistern or several smaller ones, and they could be supplied by runoff from neighbouring mountains. The cisterns were built out of bricks or stones, coated with waterproof plaster, and almost certainly covered to protect them from evaporation. Some may have received water conveyed through channels from nearby springs. In at least one , hydraulic tanks and troughs were found. Wells were located at the bottom of funnels dug into the sand, and later wells often included water sweeps or water wheels.
The structures had one gate to the outside,  towers with stairs at the corners, and several rooms facing an interior courtyard that contained the wells or cisterns. The rooms, presumably covered with roofs made out of plant material, were presumably used as barracks while animals remained within the courtyard. The  were situated along trade routes. 

Apart from water supply, they might have been used as trading monitoring posts for tax collection purposes, as garrisons and also as military-representative structures. Some  were used as water sources to irrigate land, and to supply water for the port of Berenice Troglodytica (Berenike). The fortifications served to protect the well from desert sand.

These forts are attested by Pliny, in texts found through the Eastern Desert, reports of individual transports, as well as in the Antonine Itinerary and the Tabula Peutingeriana. While Strabo mentions that the first ones were built by Ptolemy II, most were built by the Romans between the first and second century AD on the old Egyptian routes between the Nile Valley and the Red Sea, after the earlier Ptolemaic trade route between Edfu and Berenike was largely abandoned. Reportedly, Emperor Vespasian fortified many , which thus became , presumably because indigenous people began to use camels for raids. They were later often repaired or reconstructed. Today many are either destroyed or buried by sand, some were restaurated in the early 20th century.

Roads with hydreumata 

They are found along the old roads that lead to Berenike and Myos Hormos. These ports were part of the Roman-Indian trade routes and were active during the era of the early Roman Empire, when as many as hundred ships departed from Berenike every year, and are mentioned in ancient accounts like the Periplus of the Erythraean Sea. Traffic through these routes increased after the discovery of the monsoon winds and was mostly by caravan, without wagons. These ports were not self-sufficient, instead relying on supplies brought to them overland from the Nile Valley, as contemporary records indicate. The roads were not paved nor did they feature milestones, sometimes they were not even cleared of rocks on the roadway. Numerous branch roads connected the roads with each other and with sites like quarries. Caravans on average would have reached each  after two days from the last one; Strabo reports that some travel occurred during night.

The two roads to Berenike and Myos Hormos have distinct  architectures, which may be due to them having different stategic importance to the Romans, as the Koptos-Myos Hormos route may have doubled as an internal military border. Additionally, there are non- buildings along the roads, as well as gold mines.

Examples 

 Bi'r Nakheil, el-Duwi (which also featured semicircular towers), Seyala, el-Hamrah, el-Zerkah, Bir Umm Fawakhir, el-Hammamat, el-Muweih, Qasr el-Banat, el-Laqeita (after a palm grove that still exists today) and el-Matula on the road from Myos Hormos (Quseir) to Koptos (Qift). 
 Along the road from Berenike to Koptos one finds Wadi Abu Greiya (sometimes misread as ),  (sometimes identified as Wadi el-Khashir, which is improbable), Abu Ghusun, ad-Dweig, Wadi Gerf,  (which could be either Bezah or Wadi Abu Greiya), Wadi Dagbagh (of unknown etymology),  (with an associated rock shelter) and Khasm el-Menih. Another  is off-road at Siket.
There are also forts, cisterns, camps and other kinds of stop along this road.

Other small  lie along the Edfu (Apollonopolis Magna)-Berenike road at Abbad, Abu Rahal, Abu Midrik, Rod al-Legah, Seyrig and Umm Gariya. Their occurrence has been reported from west of the Nile as well, in particular late Roman oasis fortifications, but not from Numidia. In the Libyan Desert, Roman-era  resemble  but were fortified grain-houses.

References

Sources

External links
Ancient History Sourcebook: Pliny: Natural History 6.96-111. (On India)
Abu Qreiya
Samut
Saudi Aramco World Louis Werner, "Via Porphyrites" November/December 1998

Near East in classical antiquity
Oases